WCDS (1230 AM and 104.7 FM) is a radio station that broadcasts a sports radio format. The station is licensed to Glasgow, Kentucky, and serves the Glasgow/Bowling Green radio market, including the Cave region of west-central Kentucky. It is owned by Commonwealth Broadcasting through licensee Newberry Broadcasting, Inc, and is an affiliate of Fox Sports Radio.

Programming 
The station broadcasts Fox Sports sports talk. It includes Dan Patrick, Colin Cowherd, and Doug Gottlieb. It also covers via its website local sports for Barren County High School, Glasgow High School and Caverna High School. It broadcasts Cincinnati Reds games, Western Kentucky University sports, and the Brown Sports Bag with James Brown and John Butler.

References

External links

 
 

CDS
Radio stations established in 2007
2007 establishments in Kentucky
Fox Sports Radio stations
Glasgow, Kentucky